Hirsch Berlinski was born in 1908. He was member of the Left Poalai Zion party and one of the organizers of the Jewish Combat Organization. In opposition to calls from community leaders in Warsaw Ghetto for accommodation with the invading forces, he was an advocate of collective resistance against the Nazis. During the Warsaw Ghetto Uprising he commanded a group of Poalai Zion fighters in the main ghetto. He escaped through the sewage system in the Aryan sector. He was killed during the Warsaw Uprising on September 27, 1944.

References

1908 births
1944 deaths
Warsaw Ghetto inmates
Jewish Combat Organization members